My Cassette Player is the debut studio album of German singer Lena Meyer-Landrut. It was released under her stage name Lena on 7 May 2010, and debuted at number one in the German albums chart. The album has been certified five times gold in Germany, indicating sales of 500,000.

Production
My Cassette Player includes Meyer-Landrut's number-one single "Satellite", which was Germany's winning entry at the Eurovision Song Contest 2010, as well as her songs "Love Me" and "Bee", which had been released previously on 13 March 2010. It also features cover versions of "My Same" by Adele and "Mr. Curiosity" by Jason Mraz, both of which had been performed by Meyer-Landrut during Unser Star für Oslo (Our Star for Oslo), the German national pre-selection programme for the Eurovision Song Contest 2010, as well as a cover version of "Not Following", an unreleased song by English singer-songwriter Ellie Goulding. All of the other songs were written or co-written by Stefan Raab and Meyer-Landrut herself.

The cover photo was created by Sophie Krische. The cassette recorder on the cover is a SKR 700, produced in the former GDR.
The artwork of the album booklet was done by Ronald Reinsberg.

The second maxi-single from the album is "Touch a New Day", its B-side being the song "We Can't Go On", previously only released as bonus material.

Critical reception

In Germany, initial reviews of the album were mixed. While Stuttgarter Nachrichten criticised the overly distinct influence of producer Stefan Raab, Neue Presse deemed it a "charming debut", and Hannoversche Allgemeine called it "somewhat banal" but still a "good pop album", characterising "Bee" as a "cheerful hymn to independence" and "Satellite" as "still sounding astonishingly fresh, even after its massive airplay".

In foreign press, the album was critically panned with a number of reviews blaming nonsensical lyrics and Lena's weak voice. In Sweden, the website Kritiker assigned a normalised rating out of 5.0 to reviews from mainstream critics across the country and gave the album an average score of 2.0, based on 13 reviews, which indicates negative to mixed reviews. Jenny Seth of Aftonbladet accused Lena of being "a precocious teenager" with "forced vocals...[and] banal lyrics about bees". She added that, whilst Lena "is influenced by Kate Nash and Adele, she sounds rather [like a] wimpy Colbie Caillat and Jason Mraz's unbearably perky little sister". Anders Nunstedt, music editor from the Swedish tabloid Expressen, gave the album a harsh review calling it a "bland pop debut with nonsense lyrics" and criticising Lena's "exaggerated British accent". Carina Jonsson in Nerikes Allehanda gave the album only one out of five and criticised Lena's vocal ability, saying she "sings as bad as any karaoke rookie, also, she has added a hard-won goofy English accent".

Track listing

Personnel

Lead vocals
 Lena Meyer-Landrut

Additional vocals
 Christoph Leis-Bendorf
 Jan Löchel
 Kayna

Additional Musicians
 Thorsten Brötzmann – keyboards
 Axel Grube – bass
 Michael Knauer – keyboards
 Peter Weihe – guitar

Audio mastering
 Sascha "Busy" Bühren
 Jeo@Jeopark
 Michael Schwabe

Production
 Andre "Brix" Buchmann
 John Gordon
 Per Kristian "Boots" Ottestad
 Ingo Politz
 Stefan Raab
 Bernd Wendtland

Artwork/Photos
 Sophie Krische
 Ronald Reinsberg

Writing (lyrics and music)
 Adele Laurie Blue Adkins
 Matty Benbrook
 Jim Duguid
 Julie Frost

 Rosi Golan
 John Gordon (music)
 Elena Jane "Ellie" Goulding
 Pär Lammers
 Jonny Lattimer
 Lester A. Mendez
 Lena Meyer-Landrut (lyrics)
 Dennis James Morris
 Jason Mraz
 Paolo Nutini
 Per Kristian "Boots" Ottestad
 Stefan Raab
 Daniel Schaub
 Mayaeni Strauss

Source:

Charts

Weekly charts

Year-end charts

Certifications

References

External links

2010 debut albums
Lena Meyer-Landrut albums